Thomas Jefferson Green (February 14, 1802 – December 12, 1863) was an American politician who served in the legislatures of three different U.S. states and also of Texas, which was not yet a state.

Biography
Born in Warren County, North Carolina in 1802, Green served in the North Carolina Legislature in 1823, then moved to Florida and served in the Florida Legislature and next moved to Texas in 1836. On March 19, he was commissioned as a brigadier general in the Texas volunteer army. To achieve this rank, he had to raise and transport a brigade of soldiers to Texas and secure a loan of $50,000 in support the Texas Revolution.

After the revolution, Green served in both houses of the Congress of the Texas Republic. His first term in Texas began on October 3, 1836, when Green represented Bexar County in the First Texas Congress. He was elected to represent Brazoria County in the Eighth Texas Congress.

In the early 1840s, Thomas J. Green was a member of the Somervell Expedition and was second in command during the ill-fated Mier Expedition. These were military ventures into Mexico, in retaliation for predatory raids by Mexican forces.

Green left Texas just before it was annexed to the United States. He moved to California during the gold rush and was elected to the first California Senate in 1850.  There, he sponsored the bill which created the University of California. He also became a major general in the California militia.

Finally, Green returned to his native North Carolina, where he died in 1863.

He was the father of Wharton Jackson Green. His great uncle was Nathaniel Macon.

References

External links
Handbook of Texas

1802 births
1863 deaths
California state senators
Members of the North Carolina General Assembly
Members of the Florida House of Representatives
Members of the Texas Legislature
Republic of Texas Senators
19th-century American politicians
People from Warren County, North Carolina